The Mayo County Board of the Gaelic Athletic Association (GAA) or Mayo GAA is one of the 32 county boards of the GAA in Ireland, and is responsible for Gaelic games in County Mayo and the Mayo county teams.

The county football team was the second from the province of Connacht to win an All-Ireland Senior Football Championship (SFC), following Galway, but the first to appear in the final. Mayo play in the Connacht Senior Football Championship. The team has won three All-Ireland Senior Football Championships; 1936, 1950, 1951 and has acquired a long-term record for reaching eleven All-Ireland SFC finals only to fall at the ultimate hurdle in 1989, 1996, 1997, 2004, 2006, 2012, 2013, 2016, 2017, 2020 and 2021. Mayo has won the greatest number of National Football League titles consecutively (six, from 1934 to 1939). Mayo was the longest serving team in Division 1 of the National Football League when relegated in 2020, having played there since 1997. In 2021, Mayo gained promotion, at the first attempt, back to Division 1 of the National League.

Governance
Hurling in Mayo is administered by the Mayo GAA Hurling Committee, which is a sub-committee of the Mayo GAA County Board.

Football

Clubs

Clubs contest the Mayo Senior Football Championship.

Crossmolina Deel Rovers won the 2000–01 All-Ireland Senior Club Football Championship.

Ballina Stephenites won the 2004–05 All-Ireland Senior Club Football Championship.

County team

The county team won its first All-Ireland Senior Football Championship (SFC) in 1936, defeating Laois in the final.

It won a second All-Ireland SFC in 1950, defeating Louth in the final. The team retained the All-Ireland SFC in 1951, defeating Meath in the final.

Mayo did not appear in another All-Ireland SFC final until 1989, losing to Cork.

Since 1989, the team has appeared in (and lost) All-Ireland SFC finals in 1996, 1997, 2004, 2006, 2012, 2013, 2016 (drawn game and replay), 2017, 2020 and 2021. Three of those were one-point losses: 2013, 2016 (replay) and 2017.

Mayo scored 21 points to Dublin's nine in the 2016 drawn game but two of the scores were own goals by Mayo players. In 2020, Mayo conceded the fastest goal in the history of All-Ireland SFC finals, knocking more than twenty seconds off a record which had stood for 58 years. In the 2021 loss, Ryan O'Donoghue hit a penalty against the goalpost and numerous other goal chances were squandered. A curse is said to be upon the Mayo football team.

Hurling

Clubs

Although not a traditional hurling county, hurling is strong in certain parts of the county especially in the eastern region around Ballyhaunis and Tooreen. Mayo has four senior hurling clubs, each of which competes against the others annually for the TJ Tyrell Mayo Senior Hurling Championship. These four clubs are Tooreen, Ballyhaunis, Castlebar Mitchels and Westport. Tooreen has the most titles, with 26.

Ballyhaunis is the reigning senior champion club; it has six senior titles.

Hurling at underage level is also expanding in Mayo, with ten clubs competing in underage leagues and championships in the county. As well as the four adult sides named above, four other underage clubs have formed in recent years. These clubs are Ballyvary, Moytura, Caiseal Gaels and Claremorris.

County team

The four senior clubs (see above) provide players for the Mayo senior hurling panel, which participates in the National Hurling League and the All-Ireland Christy Ring (Tier 2) Cup.

The ten underage clubs (see above) provide players for the Mayo underage hurling development panels. Mayo has development panels at under-14, under-15, under-16 and minor age-groups, and competes in the All-Ireland 'B' competitions each year.

The Mayo under-21 hurling team competes in the Connacht U-21B Hurling Championship each year alongside Leitrim, Roscommon and Sligo.

Mayo won the 2016 Nicky Rackard Cup, defeating Armagh by a scoreline of 2–16 to 1–15 at Croke Park.

Ladies' football

Camogie
Mayo contested the All-Ireland Senior Camogie Championship final of 1959, captained by Josie Ruane from Menulla. Na Brídeoga won the Coiste Chontae an Chláir Shield at Féile na nGael in 2009, Parke (1983) and Ardagh (1988) had previously won divisional honours.

The county hosted the 2007 Máire Ní Chinnéide Cup.

Under Camogie's National Development Plan 2010–2015, "Our Game, Our Passion", Donegal, Kerry, Mayo and Monaghan were to get a total of 14 new clubs by 2015.

Club roll of honour (since 1951)

Further reading
 Clune, M. A. (1954) Mayo's Football Triumphs. Dublin: Pearse Press
 Reilly, Terry & Neill, Ivan (1985) The Green Above the Red: a compilation of Mayo's All-Ireland triumphs at all levels. Ballina: Western People

References

1.

External links

 Mayo GAA website
 Mayo Club '51
 Mayo on Hoganstand.com
 National and provincial titles won by Mayo teams
 Green and Red, Mayo GAA news, views and over a century of results
 Club Mayo Dublin

 
Gaelic games governing bodies in Connacht
Sport in County Mayo